Mohammad Naeem (born 1 August 1986) is a Pakistani first-class cricketer who plays for Federally Administered Tribal Areas.

References

External links
 

1986 births
Living people
Pakistani cricketers
Federally Administered Tribal Areas cricketers
People from Dera Ismail Khan District